This is a seat by seat list of candidates in the 2004 Canadian election.

For more information about the election see 2004 Canadian federal election.

2004 federal redistribution
Due to the 2001 census, Canada's 301 electoral districts increased to 308 as of April 1, 2004. Boundary changes took effect across the country to even out population redistribution, and seven new districts were formed. Each province has a minimum number of seats, and therefore it is rare for a province to lose seats in a redistribution. The numbers beside the region names correspond to the map below.

Candidates and ridings

All candidate names are those on the official list of confirmed candidates; names in media or on party website may differ slightly.

Names in bold represent party leaders and cabinet ministers.
† represents that the incumbent chose not to run again.
§ represents that the incumbent was defeated for nomination.
‡ represents that the incumbent ran in a different district.
@ represents that the candidate was automatically granted the nomination by party leader.

Nominations closed on June 7, 2004.  Elections Canada released a final candidate list on June 9.

Party key and abbreviations guide

Newfoundland and Labrador

Prince Edward Island

Nova Scotia

New Brunswick

Quebec
 
Throughout most of recent history, the Liberals have dominated in federal politics in Quebec, even when Quebec voters were simultaneously electing the Parti Québécois at the provincial level.

There have been temporary Progressive Conservative breakthroughs under Diefenbaker in the 1958 election, and under native son Brian Mulroney in the 1984 election and the 1988 election, but these did not last.  The 1958 result was helped by an alliance with Maurice Duplessis's formidable provincial electoral machine. But by the 1962 election, Duplessis had died and his Union Nationale party was out of office and in disarray, and Diefenbaker's support in Quebec had evaporated.  The Mulroney-era resurgence also collapsed entirely when he retired from politics.

The Bloc Québécois was formed for the 1993 election in the aftermath of the failure of the Meech Lake Accord and Charlottetown Accord, and has won more seats in Quebec than the Liberals in every election it has run in. The number of seats won by the Bloc has declined in each successive election from 1993 to 1997 to 2000. The party has now had a resurgence due to the sponsorship scandal and the unpopularity of Jean Charest's provincial Liberal government, which influences support for the federal Liberals even though the two parties are independent of one another.

Polls show the Bloc with a strong lead, and they may return to the number of seats they had in 1993.  However, the Liberals are likely to dominate in many parts of Montreal. Ridings where Anglophone voters are a significant factor are among the safest Liberal seats in all of Canada.

The other two major federal parties, the Conservatives and the New Democratic Party (NDP) are not expected to win any seats and are struggling to move out of single digits in the polls.  The NDP in particular has historically never had any electoral success in Quebec up to that point.

Eastern Quebec

Côte-Nord and Saguenay

Quebec City

Central Quebec

Eastern Townships

Montérégie

Eastern Montreal

Western Montreal

Northern Montreal and Laval

Laurentides, Outaouais and Northern Quebec

Ontario
 Ontario was predicted to be the battle ground of this election. Most pundits believed that this is where the election was lost for the Conservatives. Ontario is home to more than one third of all of Canada's ridings. In the last three elections, right wing vote splitting has resulted in just six riding losses for the Liberals, compared to 299 riding wins. However, the Canadian Alliance and the Progressive Conservatives have merged, and they should win many seats in Ontario, especially in rural ridings in midwestern Ontario, Central-eastern Ontario, and Central Ontario. The NDP has some support in various pockets in Ontario in the past, but has only won one riding in the last three elections, and one more in a by-election, both in Windsor. However, the NDP was expected to do well not only in Windsor, but in Hamilton, Downtown Toronto, Ottawa Centre, and possibly even in Northern Ontario.

Ottawa

Eastern Ontario

Central Ontario

Southern Durham and York

|-
|bgcolor=whitesmoke|Ajax—Pickering
||
|Mark Holland21,70649.77%
|
|René Soetens14,66633.63%
|
|Kevin Modeste5,28612.12%
|
|Karen MacDonald1,9514.47%
|
|
| colspan=2 align="center"|new district
|-
|bgcolor=whitesmoke|Markham—Unionville
||
|John McCallum30,44266.31%
|
|Joe Li10,32522.49%
|
|Janice Hagan3,9938.70%
|
|Ed Wong1,1482.50%
|
|
||
|John McCallum
|-
|rowspan=2 bgcolor=whitesmoke|Oak Ridges—Markham
|rowspan=2 |
|rowspan=2 |Lui Temelkovski31,96451.73%
|rowspan=2 |
|rowspan=2 |Bob Callow20,71233.52%
|rowspan=2 |
|rowspan=2 |Pamela Courtot5,4308.79%
|rowspan=2 |
|rowspan=2 |Bernadette Manning2,4063.89%
|
|Jim Conrad (PC)820 1.33%
|rowspan=2 colspan=2 align="center"|new district
|-
|
|Maurice G Whittle (CHP)458 0.74%
|-
|bgcolor=whitesmoke|Oshawa
|
|Louise V. Parkes14,51030.47%
||
|Colin Carrie15,81533.21%
|
|Sid Ryan15,35232.24%
|
|Liisa Whalley1,8503.89%
|
|Tim Sullivan (M-L)910.19%
||
|Ivan Grose§
|-
|bgcolor=whitesmoke|Pickering—Scarborough East
||
|Dan McTeague27,31256.98%
|
|Tim Dobson13,41727.99%
|
|Gary Dale5,39211.25%
|
|Matthew Pollesel1,8093.77%
|
|
||
|Dan McTeague
|-
|bgcolor=whitesmoke|Richmond Hill
||
|Bryon Wilfert27,10258.48%
|
|Pete Merrifield11,53024.88%
|
|C. Nella Cotrupi4,4959.70%
|
|Tim Rudkins2,1444.63%
|
|Ellena Lam (PC)1,0742.32%
||
|Bryon Wilfert
|-
|rowspan=2 bgcolor=whitesmoke|Thornhill
|rowspan=2 |
|rowspan=2 |Susan Kadis28,70954.58%
|rowspan=2 |
|rowspan=2 |Josh Cooper18,12534.46%
|rowspan=2 |
|rowspan=2 |Rick Morelli3,6716.98%
|rowspan=2 |
|rowspan=2 |Lloyd Helferty1,6223.08%
|
|Benjamin Fitzerman (Ind.)241 0.46%
|rowspan=2 |
|rowspan=2 |Elinor Caplan†
|-
|
|Simion Iron (Ind.)233 0.44%
|-
|rowspan=2 bgcolor=whitesmoke|Vaughan
|rowspan=2 |
|rowspan=2 |Maurizio Bevilacqua31,43062.96%
|rowspan=2 |
|rowspan=2 |Joe Spina11,82123.68%
|rowspan=2 |
|rowspan=2 |Octavia Beckles4,3718.76%
|rowspan=2 |
|rowspan=2 |Russell Korus1,7223.45%
|
|Walter Aolari (CAP)192 0.38%
|rowspan=2 |
|rowspan=2 |Maurizio Bevilacqua
|-
|
|Paolo Fabrizio (Libert.)388 0.78%
|-
|bgcolor=whitesmoke|Whitby—Oshawa
||
|Judi Longfield25,64945.04%
|
|Ian MacNeil20,53136.06%
|
|Maret Sadem-Thompson8,00214.05%
|
|Michael MacDonald2,7594.85%
|
|
||
|Judi Longfield
|}

Central Toronto

|-
|rowspan=2 bgcolor=whitesmoke|Beaches—East York
|rowspan=2 |
|rowspan=2 |Maria Minna22,49447.93%
|rowspan=2 |
|rowspan=2 |Nick Nikopoulos6,60314.07%
|rowspan=2 |
|rowspan=2 |Peter Tabuns15,15632.29%
|rowspan=2 |
|rowspan=2 |Peter Davison2,1274.53%
|rowspan=2 |
|rowspan=2 |Daniel Dufresne3650.78%
|rowspan=2 |
|rowspan=2 |Roger Carter460.10%
|
|Miguel Figueroa (Comm.)62 0.13%
|rowspan=2 |
|rowspan=2 |Maria Minna
|-
|
|Edward Slota (Ind.)80 0.17%
|-
|rowspan=2 bgcolor=whitesmoke|Davenport
|rowspan=2 |
|rowspan=2 |Mario Silva16,77350.69%
|rowspan=2 |
|rowspan=2 |Theresa Rodrigues3,0779.30%
|rowspan=2 |
|rowspan=2 |Rui Pires11,29234.13%
|rowspan=2 |
|rowspan=2 |Mark O'Brien1,3844.18%
|rowspan=2 |
|rowspan=2 |Elmer Gale2510.76%
|rowspan=2 |
|rowspan=2 |Sarah Thompson790.24%
|
|Johan Boyden (Comm.)137 0.41%
|rowspan=2 |
|rowspan=2 |Charles Caccia†
|-
|
|John Riddell (CAP)97 0.29%
|-
|bgcolor=whitesmoke|Don Valley West
||
|John Godfrey30,61559.79%
|
|David Turnbull14,49528.31%
|
|David Thomas4,3938.58%
|
|Serge Abbat1,7033.33%
|
|
|
|
|
|
||
|John Godfrey
|-
|bgcolor=whitesmoke|Eglinton—Lawrence
||
|Joseph Volpe28,36060.24%
|
|Bernie Tanz11,79225.05%
|
|Max Silverman4,88610.38%
|
|Shel Goldstein1,9244.09%
|
|
|
|
|
|Corrinne Prévost (CAP)1150.24%
||
|Joe Volpe
|-
|bgcolor=whitesmoke|Parkdale—High Park
||
|Sarmite (Sam) Bulte19,72742.05%
|
|Jurij Klufas7,22115.39%
|
|Peggy Nash16,20134.53%
|
|Neil Spiegel3,2496.93%
|
|Terry Parker3840.82%
|
|Lorne Gershuny1300.28%
|
|
||
|Sarmite Bulte
|-
|bgcolor=whitesmoke|St. Paul's
||
|Carolyn Bennett32,17158.39%
|
|Barry Cline11,22620.38%
|
|Norman Tobias8,66715.73%
|
|Peter Elgie3,0315.50%
|
|
|
|
|
|
||
|Carolyn Bennett
|-
|rowspan=2 bgcolor=whitesmoke|Toronto Centre
|rowspan=2 |
|rowspan=2 |Bill Graham30,33656.53%
|rowspan=2 |
|rowspan=2 |Megan Harris7,93614.79%
|rowspan=2 |
|rowspan=2 |Michael Shapcott12,74723.75%
|rowspan=2 |
|rowspan=2 |Gabriel Draven2,0973.91%
|rowspan=2 |
|rowspan=2 |Jay Wagner3130.58%
|rowspan=2 |
|rowspan=2 |Philip Fernandez650.12%
|
|Dan Goldstick (Comm.)106 0.20%
|rowspan=2 |
|rowspan=2 |Bill Graham
|-
|
|Kevin Peck (CAP)63 0.12%
|-
|bgcolor=whitesmoke|Toronto—Danforth
|
|Dennis Mills19,80341.34%
|
|Loftus Cuddy2,9756.21%
||
|Jack Layton22,19846.34%
|
|Jim Harris2,5755.38%
|
|Scott Yee2650.55%
|
|Marcell Rodden840.18%
|
|
||
|Dennis Mills
|-
|rowspan=3 bgcolor=whitesmoke|Trinity—Spadina
|rowspan=3 |
|rowspan=3 |Tony Ianno23,20243.55%
|rowspan=3 |
|rowspan=3 |David Watters4,6058.64%
|rowspan=3 |
|rowspan=3 |Olivia Chow22,39742.04%
|rowspan=3 |
|rowspan=3 |Mark Viitala2,2594.24%
|rowspan=3 |
|rowspan=3 |
|rowspan=3 |
|rowspan=3 |Nick Lin1020.19%
|
|Tristan Alexander Downe-Dewdney (CAP)91 0.17%
|rowspan=3 |
|rowspan=3 |Tony Ianno
|-
|
|Asif Hossain (PC)531 1.00%
|-
|
|Daniel Knezetic (NA)89 0.17%
|-
|bgcolor=whitesmoke|York South—Weston
||
|Alan Tonks20,53759.83%
|
|Stephen Halicki5,13314.95%
|
|Paul Ferreira7,28121.21%
|
|Jessica Fracassi1,1993.49%
|
|
|
|
|
|Shirley Hawley (Comm.)1750.51%
||
|Alan Tonks
|}

Suburban Toronto

Brampton, Mississauga and Oakville

|-
|bgcolor=whitesmoke|Bramalea—Gore—Malton
||
|Gurbax S. Malhi20,39449.54%
|
|Raminder Gill12,59430.59%
|
|Fernando Miranda6,11314.85%
|
|Sharleen McDowall1,8324.45%
|
|Frank Chilelli (M-L)2370.58%
||
|Gurbax S. Malhi
|-
|bgcolor=whitesmoke|Brampton—Springdale
||
|Ruby Dhalla@19,38547.73%
|
|Sam Hundal111,18227.53%
|
|Kathy Pounder8,03819.79%
|
|Nick Hudson1,9274.74%
|
|Gurdev Singh Mattu (Comm.)860.21%
||
|Sarkis Assadourian†
|-
|bgcolor=whitesmoke|Brampton West
||
|Colleen Beaumier21,25445.30%
|
|Tony Clement18,76840.00%
|
|Chris Moise4,92010.49%
|
|Sanjeev Goel1,6033.42%
|
|Tom Bose (Ind.)3710.79%
||
|Colleen Beaumier
|-
|bgcolor=whitesmoke|Mississauga—Brampton South
||
|Navdeep Bains24,75357.16%
|
|Parvinder Sandhu10,43324.09%
|
|Larry Taylor6,41114.80%
|
|Paul Simas1,5253.52%
|
|David Gershuny (M-L)1850.43%
|colspan=2 align="center"|new district
|-
|rowspan=3 bgcolor=whitesmoke|Mississauga East—Cooksville
|rowspan=3 |
|rowspan=3 |Albina Guarnieri22,43556.70%
|rowspan=3 |
|rowspan=3 |Riina DeFaria10,29926.03%
|rowspan=3 |
|rowspan=3 |Jim Gill4,61911.67%
|rowspan=3 |
|rowspan=3 |Jason Robert Hinchliffe1,1672.95%
|
|Pierre Chénier (M-L)154 0.39%
|rowspan=3 |
|rowspan=3 |Albina Guarnieri
|-
|
|Andrew Seitz (Ind.)114 0.29%
|-
|
|Sally Wong (CHP)778 1.97%
|-
|rowspan=3 bgcolor=whitesmoke|Mississauga—Erindale
|rowspan=3 |
|rowspan=3|Carolyn Parrish28,24654.37%
|rowspan=3|
|rowspan=3|Bob Dechert16,60031.95%
|rowspan=3|
|rowspan=3|Simon Black5,1049.82%
|rowspan=3|
|rowspan=3|Jeff Brownridge1,8553.57%
|rowspan=3|
|rowspan=3|David Greig (M-L)1450.28%
||
|Carolyn Parrish
|-
|colspan=2 align="center"|merged district
|-
||
|Steve Mahoney§
|-
|bgcolor=whitesmoke|Mississauga South
||
|Paul John Mark Szabo24,62851.67%
|
|Phil Green16,02733.62%
|
|Michael James Culkin5,00410.50%
|
|Neeraj Jain1,8993.98%
|
|Dagmar Sullivan (M-L)1070.22%
||
|Paul Szabo
|-
|bgcolor=whitesmoke|Mississauga—Streetsville
||
|Wajid Khan22,76850.56%
|
|Nina Tangri14,28731.73%
|
|Manjinder Rai4,2669.47%
|
|Otto Casanova2,4155.36%
|
|Peter Gibson Creighton (PC)1,2932.87%
|colspan=2 align="center"|new district
|-
|bgcolor=whitesmoke|Oakville
||
|M.A. Bonnie Brown28,72952.01%
|
|Rick Byers19,52435.35%
|
|Alison Myrden4,0277.29%
|
|Tania Orton2,8615.18%
|
|Zeshan Shahbaz (CAP)950.17%
||
|Bonnie Brown
|}

Hamilton, Burlington and Niagara

|-
|bgcolor=whitesmoke|Ancaster—Dundas—Flamborough—Westdale
||
|Russ Powers21,93539.69%
|
|David Sweet19,13534.63%
|
|Gordon Guyatt11,55720.91%
|
|David Januczkowski2,6364.77%
|
|
|
|
||
|John Bryden§1
|-
|bgcolor=whitesmoke|Burlington
||
|Paddy Torsney27,42344.96%
|
|Mike Wallace23,38938.35%
|
|David Carter Laird6,58110.79%
|
|Angela Reid3,1695.20%
|
|John Herman Wubs4290.70%
|
|
||
|Paddy Torsney
|-
|bgcolor=whitesmoke|Halton
||
|Gary Carr27,36248.35%
|
|Dean Martin21,70438.35%
|
|Anwar Naqvi4,6428.20%
|
|Frank Marchetti2,8895.10%
|
|
|
|
||
|Julian Reed†
|-
|rowspan=2 bgcolor=whitesmoke|Hamilton Centre
|rowspan=2 |
|rowspan=2 |Stan Keyes14,94833.70%
|rowspan=2 |
|rowspan=2 |Leon Patrick O'Connor6,71415.13%
|rowspan=2 |
|rowspan=2 |David Christopherson20,32145.81%
|rowspan=2 |
|rowspan=2 |Anne Marie Pavlov1,4223.21%
|rowspan=2 |
|rowspan=2 |Stephen Downey5201.17%
|
|Michael James Baldasaro (NA)345 0.78%
|rowspan=2 |
|rowspan=2 |Stan Keyes
|-
|
|Jamilé Ghaddar (M-L)91 0.21%
|-
|rowspan=3 bgcolor=whitesmoke|Hamilton East—Stoney Creek
|rowspan=3 |
|rowspan=3|Tony Valeri18,41737.74%
|rowspan=3|
|rowspan=3|Fred Eisenberger10,88822.31%
|rowspan=3|
|rowspan=3|Tony DePaulo17,49035.84%
|rowspan=3|
|rowspan=3|Richard Safka1,4462.96%
|rowspan=3|
|rowspan=3|
|rowspan=3|
|rowspan=3|Sam Cino (Ind.)393 0.81%————Bob Mann (Comm.)166 0.34%
||
|Tony Valeri
|-
|colspan=2 align="center"|merged district
|-
||
|Sheila Copps§
|-
|bgcolor=whitesmoke|Hamilton Mountain
||
|Beth Phinney18,54834.81%
|
|Tom Jackson15,59029.26%
|
|Chris Charlton17,55232.94%
|
|Jo Pavlov1,3782.59%
|
|
|
|Paul Lane (M-L)2140.40%
||
|Beth Phinney
|-
|bgcolor=whitesmoke|Niagara Falls
|
|Victor Pietrangelo18,74536.48%
||
|Rob Nicholson19,88238.70%
|
|Wayne Gates10,68020.79%
|
|Ted Mousseau2,0714.03%
|
|
|
|
||
|Gary Pillitteri†
|-
|bgcolor=whitesmoke|Niagara West—Glanbrook
|
|Debbie Zimmerman20,21039.01%
||
|Dean Allison20,87440.29%
|
|Dave Heatley7,68114.82%
|
|Tom Ferguson1,7613.40%
|
|David Bylsma1,1072.14%
|
|Phil Rose (CAP)1790.35%
| colspan=2 align="center"|new district
|-
|rowspan=2 bgcolor=whitesmoke|St. Catharines
|rowspan=2 |
|rowspan=2 |Walt Lastewka21,27740.44%
|rowspan=2 |
|rowspan=2 |Leo Bonomi18,26134.71%
|rowspan=2 |
|rowspan=2 |Ted Mouradian10,13519.26%
|rowspan=2 |
|rowspan=2 |Jim Fannon1,9273.66%
|rowspan=2 |
|rowspan=2 |Linda Klassen7511.43%
|
|Elaine Couto (M-L)61 0.12%
|rowspan=2 |
|rowspan=2 |Walt Lastewka
|-
|
|Jane Elizabeth Paxton (CAP)204 0.39%
|-
|rowspan=3 bgcolor=whitesmoke|Welland
|rowspan=3 |
|rowspan=3|John Maloney19,64239.63%
|rowspan=3|
|rowspan=3|Mel Grunstein12,99726.22%
|rowspan=3|
|rowspan=3|Jody Di Bartolomeo14,62329.50%
|rowspan=3|
|rowspan=3|Ryan McLaughlin1,4542.93%
|rowspan=3|
|rowspan=3|Irma D. Ruiter7351.48%
|rowspan=3|
|rowspan=3|Ron Walker (M-L)1130.23%
||
|John Maloney
|-
|colspan=2 align="center"|merged district
|-
||
|Tony Tirabassi§
|}

Midwestern Ontario
  

|-
|bgcolor=whitesmoke|Brant
||
|Lloyd St. Amand20,45538.05%
|
|Greg Martin17,79233.10%
|
|Lynn Bowering11,82622.00%
|
|Helen-Anne Embry2,7385.09%
|
|Barra L. Gots5701.06%
|
|John C. Turmel (Ind.)3730.69%
||
|Jane Stewart†
|-
|rowspan=2 bgcolor=whitesmoke|Cambridge
|rowspan=2 |
|rowspan=2 |Janko Peric18,89936.65%
|rowspan=2 |
|rowspan=2 |Gary Goodyear19,12337.09%
|rowspan=2 |
|rowspan=2 |Gary Price10,39220.15%
|rowspan=2 |
|rowspan=2 |Gareth M. White2,5064.86%
|rowspan=2 |
|rowspan=2 |John G. Gots3950.77%
|
|Alex W. Gryc (Ind.)114 0.22%
|rowspan=2 |
|rowspan=2 |Janko Peric
|-
|
|John Oprea (Ind.)134 0.26%
|-
|rowspan=2 bgcolor=whitesmoke|Guelph
|rowspan=2 |
|rowspan=2 |Brenda Chamberlain23,44244.61%
|rowspan=2 |
|rowspan=2 |Jon Dearden13,72126.11%
|rowspan=2 |
|rowspan=2 |Phil Allt10,52720.03%
|rowspan=2 |
|rowspan=2 |Mike Nagy3,8667.36%
|rowspan=2 |
|rowspan=2 |Peter Ellis6341.21%
|
|Manuel Couto (M-L)66 0.13%
|rowspan=2 |
|rowspan=2 |Brenda Chamberlain
|-
|
|Lyne Rivard (Mar.)291 0.55%
|-
|bgcolor=whitesmoke|Haldimand—Norfolk
|
|Bob Speller19,33638.84%
||
|Diane Finley20,98142.15%
|
|Carrie Sinkowski7,14314.35%
|
|Colin Jones1,7033.42%
|
|Steven Elgersma6171.24%
|
|
||
|Bob Speller
|-
|bgcolor=whitesmoke|Huron—Bruce
||
|Paul Steckle25,53849.79%
|
|Barb Fisher15,93031.06%
|
|Grant Robertson6,70713.08%
|
|Dave Vasey1,5182.96%
|
|Dave Joslin9581.87%
|
|Glen Smith (Mar.)6381.24%
||
|Paul Steckle
|-
|bgcolor=whitesmoke|Kitchener Centre
||
|Karen Redman21,26447.13%
|
|Thomas Ichim12,41227.51%
|
|Richard Walsh-Bowers8,71719.32%
|
|Karol Vesely2,4505.43%
|
|
|
|Mark Corbiere (Ind.)2770.61%
||
|Karen Redman
|-
|bgcolor=whitesmoke|Kitchener—Conestoga
||
|Lynn Myers17,81942.29%
|
|Frank Luellau14,90335.37%
|
|Len Carter6,62315.72%
|
|Kris Stapleton2,7936.63%
|
|
|
|
||
|Lynn Myers
|-
|bgcolor=whitesmoke|Kitchener—Waterloo
||
|Andrew Telegdi28,01548.12%
|
|Steve Strauss17,15529.47%
|
|Edwin Laryea9,26715.92%
|
|Pauline Richards3,2775.63%
|
|Frank Ellis3790.65%
|
|Ciprian Mihalcea (Ind.)1240.21%
||
|Andrew Telegdi
|-
|rowspan=3 bgcolor=whitesmoke|Oxford
|rowspan=3 |
|rowspan=3 |Murray Coulter14,01130.52%
|rowspan=3 |
|rowspan=3 |Dave Mackenzie20,60644.89%
|rowspan=3 |
|rowspan=3 |Zoé Dorcas Kunschner6,67314.54%
|rowspan=3 |
|rowspan=3 |Irene Tietz1,9514.25%
|rowspan=3 |
|rowspan=3 |Leslie Bartley1,5343.34%
|
|James Bender (Mar.)794 1.73%
|rowspan=3 |
|rowspan=3 |John Finlay†
|-
|
|Alex Kreider (CAP)108 0.24%
|-
|
|Kaye Sargent (Libert.)226 0.49%
|-
|bgcolor=whitesmoke|Perth—Wellington
|
|Brian Innes15,03233.42%
||
|Gary Ralph Schellenberger18,87941.97%
|
|Robert Roth7,02715.62%
|
|John Cowling2,7706.16%
|
|Irma Nicolette Devries1,2732.83%
|
|
||
|Gary Schellenberger
|-
|bgcolor=whitesmoke|Wellington—Halton Hills
|
|Bruce Hood19,17338.21%
||
|Mike Chong21,47942.81%
|
|Noel Duignan5,97411.91%
|
|Brent Bouteiller2,7255.43%
|
|Pat Woode8261.65%
|
|
| colspan=2 align="center"|new district
|}

Southwestern Ontario
  

|-
|bgcolor=whitesmoke|Chatham-Kent—Essex
||
|Jerry Pickard17,43539.63%
|
|Dave Van Kesteren17,02838.70%
|
|Kathleen Kevany7,53817.13%
|
|Rod Hetherington1,8454.19%
|
|Margaret Mondaca1500.34%
|
|
||
|Jerry Pickard
|-
|rowspan=2 bgcolor=whitesmoke|Elgin—Middlesex—London
|rowspan=2 |
|rowspan=2 |Gar Knutson15,86034.20%
|rowspan=2 |
|rowspan=2 |Joe Preston20,33343.84%
|rowspan=2 |
|rowspan=2 |Tim McCallum6,76314.58%
|rowspan=2 |
|rowspan=2 |Julie-Ann Stodolny2,0334.38%
|rowspan=2 |
|rowspan=2 |
|
|Will Arlow (CAP)146 0.31%
|rowspan=2 |
|rowspan=2 |Gar Knutson
|-
|
|Ken DeVries (CHP)1,246 2.69%
|-
|bgcolor=whitesmoke|Essex
|
|Susan Whelan17,92634.95%
||
|Jeff Watson18,75536.57%
|
|David Tremblay12,51924.41%
|
|Paul Forman1,9813.86%
|
|Robert A. Cruise1050.20%
|
|
||
|Susan Whelan
|-
|bgcolor=whitesmoke|London—Fanshawe
||
|Pat O'Brien15,66438.08%
|
|John Mazzilli10,81126.28%
|
|Irene Mathyssen12,51130.41%
|
|Ed Moore1,6343.97%
|
|Cameron Switzer650.16%
|
|Derrall Bellaire (PC)4531.10%
||
|Pat O'Brien
|-
|bgcolor=whitesmoke|London North Centre
||
|Joe Fontana21,47243.08%
|
|Tim Gatten13,67727.44%
|
|Joe Swan12,03424.14%
|
|Bronagh Joyce Morgan2,3764.77%
|
|Gustavo Granados-Ocon670.13%
|
|Rod Morley (PC)2200.44%
||
|Joe Fontana
|-
|bgcolor=whitesmoke|London West
||
|Sue Barnes25,06145.48%
|
|Mike Menear17,33531.46%
|
|Gina Barber9,52217.28%
|
|Rebecca Bromwich2,6114.74%
|
|Margaret Villamizar670.12%
|
|Steve Hunter (PC)5110.93%
||
|Sue Barnes
|-
|bgcolor=whitesmoke|Middlesex—Kent—Lambton
||
|Rose-Marie Ur19,45239.73%
|
|Bev Shipley19,28839.39%
|
|Kevin Blake7,37615.06%
|
|Allan McKeown1,8343.75%
|
|
|
|Allan James (CHP)1,0152.07%
||
|Rose-Marie Ur
|-
|rowspan=3 bgcolor=whitesmoke|Sarnia—Lambton
|rowspan=3 |
|rowspan=3 |Roger Gallaway19,93241.93%
|rowspan=3 |
|rowspan=3 |Marcel Beaubien14,50030.50%
|rowspan=3 |
|rowspan=3 |Greg Agar7,76416.33%
|rowspan=3 |
|rowspan=3 |Anthony Cramer2,5485.36%
|rowspan=3 |
|rowspan=3 |
|
|Dave Core (Ind.)749 1.58%
|rowspan=3 |
|rowspan=3 |Roger Gallaway
|-
|
|Gary De Boer (CHP)1,819 3.83%
|-
|
|John Elliott (Ind.)229 0.48%
|-
|bgcolor=whitesmoke|Windsor—Tecumseh
|
|Rick Limoges16,21933.88%
|
|Rick Fuschi9,82720.53%
||
|Joe Comartin20,03741.85%
|
|Élizabeth Powles1,6133.37%
|
|Laura Chesnik1820.38%
|
|
||
|Joe Comartin
|-
|bgcolor=whitesmoke|Windsor West
|
|Richard Pollock13,83131.32%
|
|Jordan Katz8,34818.91%
||
|Brian Masse20,29745.97%
|
|Rob Spring1,5453.50%
|
|Enver Villamizar1340.30%
|
|
||
|Brian Masse
|}

Northern Ontario
 

|-
|bgcolor=whitesmoke|Algoma—Manitoulin—Kapuskasing
||
|Brent St. Denis14,27640.94%
|
|Blaine Armstrong8,09323.21%
|
|Carol Hughes11,05131.69%
|
|Lindsay Killen1,4494.16%
|
|
||
|Brent St. Denis
|-
|bgcolor=whitesmoke|Kenora
||
|Roger Valley8,56336.23%
|
|Bill Brown6,59827.92%
|
|Susan Barclay7,57732.06%
|
|Carl Chaboyer8983.80%
|
|
||
|Bob Nault†
|-
|rowspan=3 bgcolor=whitesmoke|Nickel Belt
|rowspan=3 |
|rowspan=3 |Raymond Bonin17,18842.41%
|rowspan=3 |
|rowspan=3 |Mike Dupont7,62818.82%
|rowspan=3 |
|rowspan=3 |Claude Gravelle13,98034.50%
|rowspan=3 |
|rowspan=3 |Steve Lafleur1,0312.54%
|
|Michel D. Ethier (Mar.)430 1.06%
|rowspan=3 |
|rowspan=3 |Raymond Bonin
|-
|
|Don Lavallee (Ind.)217 0.54%
|-
|
|Steve Rutchinski (M-L)51 0.13%
|-
|bgcolor=whitesmoke|Nipissing—Timiskaming
||
|Anthony Rota18,25442.31%
|
|Al McDonald16,00137.09%
|
|Dave Fluri7,35417.05%
|
|Les Wilcox1,3293.08%
|
|Ross MacLean (CAP)2040.47%
||
|Bob Wood†
|-
|bgcolor=whitesmoke|Parry Sound—Muskoka
||
|Andy Mitchell19,27143.86%
|
|Keith Montgomery15,97036.35%
|
|Jo-Anne Marie Boulding5,17111.77%
|
|Glen Hodgson3,5248.02%
|
|
||
|Andy Mitchell
|-
|bgcolor=whitesmoke|Sault Ste. Marie
|
|Carmen Provenzano15,76036.55%
|
|Cameron Ross9,96923.12%
||
|Tony Martin16,51238.29%
|
|Julie Emmerson8141.89%
|
|Mike Taffarel (M-L)670.16%
||
|Carmen Provenzano
|-
|bgcolor=whitesmoke|Sudbury
||
|Diane Marleau18,91444.19%
|
|Stephen L. Butcher9,00821.05%
|
|Gerry McIntaggart12,78129.86%
|
|Luke Norton1,9994.67%
|
|Dave Starbuck (M-L)1000.23%
||
|Diane Marleau
|-
|rowspan=2 bgcolor=whitesmoke|Thunder Bay—Rainy River
|rowspan=2 |
|rowspan=2 |Ken Boshcoff14,29039.37%
|rowspan=2 |
|rowspan=2 |David Leskowski9,55926.33%
|rowspan=2 |
|rowspan=2 |John Rafferty10,78129.70%
|rowspan=2 |
|rowspan=2 |Russ Aegard8562.36%
|
|Johannes Scheibler (CHP)267 0.74%
|rowspan=2 |
|rowspan=2 |Stan Dromisky†
|-
|
|Doug Thompson (Mar.)547 1.51%
|-
|bgcolor=whitesmoke|Thunder Bay—Superior North
||
|Joe Comuzzi15,02243.04%
|
|Bev Sarafin7,39421.18%
|
|Bruce Hyer10,23029.31%
|
|Carl Rose1,6144.62%
|
|Denis A. Carrière (Mar.)6451.85%
||
|Joe Comuzzi
|-
|rowspan=3 bgcolor=whitesmoke|Timmins—James Bay
|rowspan=3|
|rowspan=3|Raymond Chénier13,52539.65%
|rowspan=3|
|rowspan=3|Andrew Van Oosten5,68216.66%
|rowspan=3 |
|rowspan=3 |Charlie Angus14,13841.45%
|rowspan=3|
|rowspan=3|Marsha Gail Kriss7672.25%
|rowspan=3|
|rowspan=3|
||
|Réginald Bélair†
|-
|colspan=2 align="center"|merged district
|-
||
|Ben Serré†
|}

Manitoba
 Manitoba is traditionally split between the NDP, the Liberals, and the Conservatives. This is especially true in the city of Winnipeg where most Manitobans live. However, due to vote splitting in recent elections, neither the Progressive Conservatives or the Canadian Alliance/Reform Party have been able to win in Winnipeg. In rural Manitoba, the Liberals are usually shut out of elections (exception in 1993). Conservative support is normally in the more populous south, with NDP support in the sparsely populated north, which usually only means one seat.

Rural Manitoba
  

|-
| style="background-color:whitesmoke" |Brandon—Souris
|
|Murray Downing8,52224.21%
||
|Merv Tweed18,20951.72%
|
|Mike Abbey6,74019.15%
|
|David Kattenburg1,2643.59%
|
|Colin Atkins3511.00%
|
|Lisa Gallagher1180.34%
||
|Rick Borotsik†
|-
| style="background-color:whitesmoke" |Churchill
|
|Ron Evans7,60438.35%
|
|Bill Archer2,99915.13%
||
|Bev Desjarlais8,61243.44%
|
|C. David Nickarz6123.09%
|
|
|
|
||
|Bev Desjarlais
|-
| style="background-color:whitesmoke" |Dauphin—Swan River
|
|Don Dewar6,80920.38%
||
|Inky Mark18,02553.95%
|
|Walter Kolisnyk7,34121.97%
|
|Lindy Clubb6732.01%
|
|David C. Andres5601.68%
|
|
||
|Inky Mark
|-
| style="background-color:whitesmoke" |Portage—Lisgar
|
|Don Kuhl6,17417.74%
||
|Brian Pallister22,93965.93%
|
|Daren Van Den Bussche3,2519.34%
|
|Marc Payette8562.46%
|
|David Reimer1,4584.19%
|
|Allister Cucksey1170.34%
||
|Brian Pallister
|-
| style="background-color:whitesmoke" |Provencher
|
|Peter Epp8,97524.92%
||
|Vic Toews22,69463.02%
|
|Sarah Zaharia3,2449.01%
|
|Janine G. Gibson1,1003.05%
|
|
|
|
||
|Vic Toews
|-
| style="background-color:whitesmoke" |Selkirk—Interlake
|
|Bruce Benson9,05922.85%
||
|James Bezan18,72747.25%
|
|Duane Nicol10,51626.53%
|
|Trevor Farley9822.48%
|
|Anthony Barendregt3530.89%
|
|
||
|Howard Hilstrom†
|}

Winnipeg
  

|-
| style="background-color:whitesmoke" |Charleswood—St. James
|
|Glen Murray17,95442.55%
||
|Steven John Fletcher18,68844.29%
|
|Peter Carney4,28310.15%
|
|Andrew Basham8802.09%
|
|Beatriz Alas490.12%
|
|Dan Zupansky3370.80%
|
|
|
|vacant1
|-
| style="background-color:whitesmoke" |Elmwood—Transcona
|
|Tanya Parks4,92316.81%
|
|Bryan McLeod7,64426.11%
||
|Bill Blaikie15,22151.99%
|
|Elijah Gair7192.46%
|
|Paul Sidon740.25%
|
|Gavin Whittaker3111.06%
|
|Robert Scott (CHP)3861.32%
||
|Bill Blaikie
|-
| style="background-color:whitesmoke" |Kildonan—St. Paul
|
|Terry Duguid13,30436.54%
||
|Joy Smith13,58237.30%
|
|Lorene Mahoney8,20222.53%
|
|Jacob Giesbrecht7562.08%
|
|
|
|Rebecca Whittaker2900.80%
|
|Katharine Reimer (CHP)2780.76%
| colspan=2 style="text-align:center;" |new district
|-
| style="background-color:whitesmoke" |Saint Boniface
||
|Raymond Simard17,98946.61%
|
|Ken Cooper11,95630.98%
|
|Mathieu Allard6,95418.02%
|
|Daniel Backé9252.40%
|
|Gérard Guay770.20%
|
|Chris Buors3170.82%
|
|Jeannine Moquin-Perry (CHP)3780.98%
||
|Raymond Simard
|-
| style="background-color:whitesmoke" |Winnipeg Centre
|
|David Northcott9,28534.69%
|
|Robert Eng3,63113.56%
||
|Pat Martin12,14945.39%
|
|Robin (Pilar) Faye1,1514.30%
|
|Anna-Celestrya Carr1140.43%
|
|John M. Siedleski3461.29%
|
|Douglas Edward Schweitzer (Ind.)920.34%
||
|Pat Martin
|-
|rowspan=3  style="background-color:whitesmoke" |Winnipeg North
|rowspan=3|
|rowspan=3|Rey D. Pagtakhan9,49136.55%
|rowspan=3|
|rowspan=3|Kris Stevenson3,18612.27%
|rowspan=3 |
|rowspan=3|Judy Wasylycia-Leis12,50748.16%
|rowspan=3|
|rowspan=3|Alon Weinberg5312.04%
|rowspan=3|
|rowspan=3|Darrell Rankin1110.43%
|rowspan=3|
|rowspan=3|
|rowspan=3|
|rowspan=3|Eric Truijen (CHP)1410.54%
||
|Rey Pagtakhan
|-
| colspan=2 style="text-align:center;" |merged district
|-
||
|Judy Wasylycia-Leis
|-
| style="background-color:whitesmoke" |Winnipeg South
||
|Reg Alcock19,27051.31%
|
|Rod Bruinooge12,77034.00%
|
|Catherine Green4,21711.23%
|
|Ron Cameron1,0032.67%
|
|
|
|
|
|Jane MacDiarmid (CHP)2960.79%
||
|Reg Alcock
|-
| style="background-color:whitesmoke" |Winnipeg South Centre
||
|Anita Neville18,13346.60%
|
|Raj Joshi10,51627.02%
|
|James Allum8,27021.25%
|
|Ian Scott1,5083.88%
|
|Andrew Dalgliesh810.21%
|
|Andy Caisse2930.75%
|
|Magnus Thompson (CAP)1140.29%
||
|Anita Neville
|}

Saskatchewan
 In terms of party lines, Saskatchewan is not divided up between north and south but by urban and rural. Traditionally, Saskatchewan has been a two-way race between the Conservatives, and later the Reform/Alliance and the NDP. Recent vote splitting has allowed the Liberals to come through and win a few seats in this polarized province. Urban Saskatchewan has tended to vote NDP and rural Saskatchewan has tended to vote Conservative. This is especially true in provincial politics, where riding boundaries more reflect the urban/rural divide. Both Saskatoon and Regina, Saskatchewans largest cities are split into 4 ridings each. All eight of these ridings are generally split evenly between rural and urban. Northern Saskatchewan has in the past been the stand-alone region of rural Saskatchewan, usually voting for the NDP.

Southern Saskatchewan

|-
|bgcolor=whitesmoke|Cypress Hills—Grasslands
|
|Bill Caton5,54718.68%
||
|David Anderson18,01060.64%
|
|Jeff Potts4,90116.50%
|
|Bev Currie1,2434.19%
|
|
|
|
||
|David L. Anderson
|-
|bgcolor=whitesmoke|Palliser
|
|John Williams8,24424.82%
||
|Dave Batters11,90935.85%
|
|Dick Proctor11,78535.48%
|
|Brian Rands8292.50%
|
|Harold Stephan4511.36%
|
|
||
|Dick Proctor
|-
|bgcolor=whitesmoke|Regina—Lumsden—Lake Centre
|
|Gary Anderson10,16732.82%
||
|Tom Lukiwski10,28933.21%
|
|Moe Kovatch8,30026.79%
|
|Fiorindo Agi7162.31%
|
|
|
|Larry Spencer1,5064.86%
||
|Larry Spencer1
|-
|bgcolor=whitesmoke|Regina—Qu'Appelle
|
|Allyce Herle7,79327.84%
||
|Andrew Scheer10,01235.76%
|
|Lorne Edmund Nystrom9,15132.69%
|
|Deanna Robilliard6392.28%
|
|Mary Sylvia Nelson2931.05%
|
|Lorne Edward Widger (NA)1060.38%
||
|Lorne Nystrom
|-
|bgcolor=whitesmoke|Souris—Moose Mountain
|
|Lonny McKague6,00119.59%
||
|Ed Komarnicki11,30636.90%
|
|Robert Stephen Stringer4,20213.72%
|
|Sigfredo Gonzalez5371.75%
|
|Robert Thomas Jacobson1910.62%
|
|Grant Devine28,39927.42%
||
|Roy Bailey†
|-
|bgcolor=whitesmoke|Wascana
||
|Ralph Goodale20,56757.17%
|
|Doug Cryer8,70924.21%
|
|Erin M. K. Weir5,77116.04%
|
|Darcy Robilliard9282.58%
|
|
|
|
||
|Ralph Goodale
|-
|bgcolor=whitesmoke|Yorkton—Melville
|
|Ted Quewezance4,69714.83%
||
|Gary Breitkreuz19,94062.94%
|
|Don Olson5,89018.59%
|
|Ralph Pilchner6301.99%
|
|
|
|David Sawkiw5241.65%
||
|Gary Breitkreuz
|}

Northern Saskatchewan

|-
|bgcolor=whitesmoke|Battlefords—Lloydminster
|
|Del Price4,61717.42%
||
|Gerry Ritz15,44158.25%
|
|Shawn McKee5,36720.25%
|
|Kelsey Pearson7662.89%
|
|Diane Stephan (CHP)3161.19%
||
|Gerry Ritz
|-
|bgcolor=whitesmoke|Blackstrap
|
|Tiffany Paulsen11,81531.40%
||
|Lynne Yelich15,60841.48%
|
|Don Kossick8,86223.55%
|
|Lynn Oliphant1,1683.10%
|
|Clayton A. Sundberg (CHP)1770.47%
||
|Lynne Yelich
|-
|bgcolor=whitesmoke|Churchill River
|
|Al Ducharme5,81529.87%
||
|Jeremy Harrison7,27937.39%
|
|Earl Cook3,91020.09%
|
|Marcella Gall5392.77%
|
|Rick Laliberte (Ind.)1,9239.88%
||
|Rick Laliberte1
|-
|bgcolor=whitesmoke|Prince Albert
|
|Patrick W. Jahn6,92924.13%
||
|Brian Fitzpatrick13,57647.28%
|
|Don Hovdebo7,22125.15%
|
|Marc Loiselle9873.44%
|
|
||
|Brian Fitzpatrick
|-
|rowspan=2 bgcolor=whitesmoke|Saskatoon—Humboldt
|rowspan=2 |
|rowspan=2 |Patrick Wolfe9,00925.52%
|rowspan=2 |
|rowspan=2 |Bradley R. Trost9,44426.75%
|rowspan=2 |
|rowspan=2 |Nettie Wiebe9,02725.57%
|rowspan=2 |
|rowspan=2 |Ron Schriml6801.93%
|
|Jim Pankiw (Ind.)7,076 20.04%
|rowspan=2 |
|rowspan=2 |Jim Pankiw2
|-
|
|Larry Zarysky (NA)71 0.20%
|-
|bgcolor=whitesmoke|Saskatoon—Rosetown—Biggar
|
|Myron Luczka4,17115.75%
||
|Carol Skelton11,87544.84%
|
|Dennis Gruending9,59736.24%
|
|Rick Barsky8413.18%
|
|
||
|Carol Skelton
|-
|bgcolor=whitesmoke|Saskatoon—Wanuskewin
|
|Chris Axworthy310,55332.58%
||
|Maurice Vellacott15,10946.64%
|
|Priscilla Settee5,77017.81%
|
|David Greenfield9602.96%
|
|
||
|Maurice Vellacott
|}

Alberta
 Alberta is unarguably the most Conservative province in Canada. You need only look at the results of the ridings here in the last century to prove this. Alberta has long been a Progressive Conservative province, but with the collapse of the party in 1993, Albertans went to the Reform Party of Canada (later the Canadian Alliance) for their vote. Edmonton seems to be the only exception to this. The Liberals have won in Edmonton six times since 1993, and the NDP has won in Edmonton as well.

Rural Alberta

|-
|bgcolor=whitesmoke|Athabasca
|
|Doug Faulkner7,15824.05%
||
|Brian Jean17,94260.30%
|
|Robert Cree3,11510.47%
|
|Ian Hopfe1,5425.18%
|
|
|colspan=2 align="center"|new district
|-
|bgcolor=whitesmoke|Crowfoot
|
|Adam Campbell3,6157.70%
||
|Kevin Sorenson37,64980.21%
|
|Ellen Parker3,2416.90%
|
|Arnold Baker1,7953.82%
|
|Max Leonard Cornelssen (Mar.)6391.36%
||
|Kevin Sorenson
|-
|rowspan=2 bgcolor=whitesmoke|Lethbridge
|rowspan=2 |
|rowspan=2 |Ken Nicol10,25021.56%
|rowspan=2 |
|rowspan=2 |Rick Casson29,76562.62%
|rowspan=2 |
|rowspan=2 |Melanee Thomas4,6239.73%
|rowspan=2 |
|rowspan=2 |Erin Marie Matthews1,2622.66%
|
|Dustin Sobie (Mar.)553 1.16%
|rowspan=2 |
|rowspan=2 |Rick Casson
|-
|
|Ken Vanden Broek (CHP)1,079 2.27%
|-
|bgcolor=whitesmoke|Macleod
|
|Chris Shade5,21412.09%
||
|Ted Menzies32,23274.76%
|
|Joyce Thomas2,8026.50%
|
|Laurel Denise Fadeeff2,8656.65%
|
|
||
|Grant Hill†
|-
|bgcolor=whitesmoke|Medicine Hat
|
|Bill Cocks4,33110.91%
||
|Monte Kenton Solberg30,24176.15%
|
|Betty Stroh3,6439.17%
|
|Kevin Dodd1,4983.77%
|
|
||
|Monte Solberg
|-
|bgcolor=whitesmoke|Peace River
|
|Lyle Carlstrom8,20018.97%
||
|Charlie Penson28,15865.13%
|
|Susan Thompson4,80411.11%
|
|Benjamin Morrison Pettit2,0734.79%
|
|
||
|Charlie Penson
|-
|bgcolor=whitesmoke|Red Deer
|
|Luke Kurata5,29411.82%
||
|Bob Mills33,51074.80%
|
|Jeff Sloychuk3,5007.81%
|
|Garfield John Marks2,1424.78%
|
|Teena Cormack (CAP)3530.79%
||
|Bob Mills
|-
|bgcolor=whitesmoke|Vegreville—Wainwright
|
|Duff Stewart5,39011.73%
||
|Leon E. Benoit33,80073.54%
|
|Len Legault3,7938.25%
|
|James Kenney2,9766.48%
|
|
||
|Leon Benoit
|-
|bgcolor=whitesmoke|Westlock—St. Paul
|
|Joe Dion7,61919.26%
||
|Dave Chatters26,43366.80%
|
|Peggy Kirkeby3,4808.79%
|
|John A. McDonald2,0365.15%
|
|
||
|David Chatters
|-
|bgcolor=whitesmoke|Wetaskiwin
|
|Rick Bonnett5,08811.93%
||
|Dale Johnston31,40473.66%
|
|Tim Robson3,0907.25%
|
|Tom Lampman2,6426.20%
|
|Brent McKelvie (CAP)4100.96%
||
|Dale Johnston
|-
|bgcolor=whitesmoke|Wild Rose
|
|Judy Stewart5,97112.64%
||
|Myron Thompson33,33770.60%
|
|Jeff Horvath4,0098.49%
|
|Chris Foote3,9048.27%
|
|
||
|Myron Thompson
|-
|bgcolor=whitesmoke|Yellowhead
|
|Peter Crossley4,44111.50%
||
|Rob Merrifield26,50368.61%
|
|Noel Lapierre4,42911.47%
|
|Eric Stieglitz2,5346.56%
|
|Jacob Strydhorst (CHP)7211.87%
||
|Rob Merrifield
|}

Edmonton and environs
 

|-
|bgcolor=whitesmoke|Edmonton—Beaumont
||
|David Kilgour17,55542.82%
|
|Tim Uppal17,42142.49%
|
|Paul Reikie3,9759.70%
|
|Michael Garfinkle1,9114.66%
|
|Naomi Rankin (Comm.)1350.33%
||
|David Kilgour
|-
|rowspan=4 bgcolor=whitesmoke|Edmonton Centre
|rowspan=4 |
|rowspan=4 |Anne McLellan22,56042.50%
|rowspan=4 |
|rowspan=4 |Laurie Hawn21,83941.14%
|rowspan=4 |
|rowspan=4 |Meghan McMaster4,8369.11%
|rowspan=4 |
|rowspan=4 |David J. Parker2,5844.87%
|
|John Baloun (Ind.)221 0.42%
|rowspan=4 |
|rowspan=4 |Anne McLellan
|-
|
|Lyle Kenny (Mar.)509 0.96%
|-
|
|Peggy Morton (M-L)78 0.15%
|-
|
|Sean Tisdall (PC)456 0.86%
|-
|bgcolor=whitesmoke|Edmonton East
|
|John Bethel@14,25032.43%
||
|Peter Goldring20,22446.02%
|
|Janina Strudwick6,46414.71%
|
|Harlan Light2,4715.62%
|
|Ed Spronk (CHP)5381.22%
||
|Peter Goldring
|-
|bgcolor=whitesmoke|Edmonton—Leduc
|
|Bruce King14,26929.32%
||
|James Rajotte26,79155.05%
|
|Doug McLachlan4,5819.41%
|
|Bruce Sinclair3,0296.22%
|
|
||
|James Rajotte
|-
|rowspan=3 bgcolor=whitesmoke|Edmonton—St. Albert
|rowspan=3|
|rowspan=3|Moe Saeed12,35924.15%
|rowspan=3 |
|rowspan=3|John Williams29,50857.65%
|rowspan=3|
|rowspan=3|Mike Melymick5,92711.58%
|rowspan=3|
|rowspan=3|Conrad A. Bitangcol3,3876.62%
|rowspan=3|
|rowspan=3|
||
|John Williams
|-
|colspan=2 align="center"|merged district
|-
||
|Deborah Grey†
|-
|bgcolor=whitesmoke|Edmonton—Sherwood Park
|
|Maureen Towns11,51924.49%
||
|Ken Epp27,22257.87%
|
|Chris Harwood5,15510.96%
|
|Margaret Marean3,1466.69%
|
|
||
|Ken Epp
|-
|bgcolor=whitesmoke|Edmonton—Spruce Grove
|
|Neil Mather12,91225.57%
||
|Rona Ambrose30,49760.40%
|
|Hayley Phillips4,5088.93%
|
|Jerry Paschen2,5725.09%
|
|
|colspan=2 align="center"|new district
|-
|rowspan=2 bgcolor=whitesmoke|Edmonton—Strathcona
|rowspan=2 |
|rowspan=2 |Debby Carlson14,05729.01%
|rowspan=2 |
|rowspan=2 |Rahim Jaffer19,08939.40%
|rowspan=2 |
|rowspan=2 |Malcolm Azania11,53523.81%
|rowspan=2 |
|rowspan=2 |Cameron Wakefield3,1466.49%
|
|Dave Dowling (Mar.)519 1.07%
|rowspan=2 |
|rowspan=2 |Rahim Jaffer
|-
|
|Kevan Hunter (M-L)103 0.21%
|}

Calgary
 

|-
|bgcolor=whitesmoke|Calgary East
|
|James Maxim7,62121.27%
||
|Deepak Obhrai21,89761.12%
|
|Elizabeth Thomas3,5359.87%
|
|Dean Kenneth Christie2,5297.06%
|
|Jason Corey Devine (Comm.)2450.68%
||
|Deepak Obhrai
|-
|rowspan=2 bgcolor=whitesmoke|Calgary North Centre
|rowspan=2 |
|rowspan=2 |Cathy McClusky11,09321.36%
|rowspan=2 |
|rowspan=2 |Jim Prentice28,14354.19%
|rowspan=2 |
|rowspan=2 |John Chan6,29812.13%
|rowspan=2 |
|rowspan=2 |Mark MacGillivray5,84011.24%
|
|Margaret Peggy Askin (M-L)184 0.35%
|rowspan=2 colspan=2 align="center"|new district
|-
|
|Michael Falconar (Ind.)380 0.73%
|-
|bgcolor=whitesmoke|Calgary Northeast
|
|Dale Muti†8,67224.62%
||
|Art Hanger21,92462.24%
|
|Giorgio Cattabeni2,6827.61%
|
|Morgan DuFord1,6584.71%
|
|Steve Garland (CAP)2910.83%
||
|Art Hanger
|-
|bgcolor=whitesmoke|Calgary—Nose Hill
|
|Ted Haney11,05122.89%
||
|Diane Ablonczy31,08864.38%
|
|Vinay Dey3,2506.73%
|
|Richard Larson2,8986.00%
|
|
||
|Diane Ablonczy
|-
|bgcolor=whitesmoke|Calgary South Centre
|
|Julia Turnbull†15,30529.89%
||
|Lee Richardson26,19251.16%
|
|Keith Purdy4,3508.50%
|
|Phillip K. Liesemer5,0809.92%
|
|Trevor Grover (CAP)2740.54%
||
|Joe Clark†
|-
|bgcolor=whitesmoke|Calgary Southeast
|
|Jim Tanner8,48816.36%
||
|Jason Kenney36,84371.00%
|
|Brian Pincott3,4196.59%
|
|George Read3,1426.05%
|
|
||
|Jason Kenney
|-
|rowspan=2 bgcolor=whitesmoke|Calgary Southwest
|rowspan=2 |
|rowspan=2 |Avalon Roberts9,50118.40%
|rowspan=2 |
|rowspan=2 |Stephen J. Harper35,29768.36%
|rowspan=2 |
|rowspan=2 |Daria Fox2,8845.59%
|rowspan=2 |
|rowspan=2 |Darcy Kraus3,2106.22%
|
|Mark de Pelham (Mar.)516 1.00%
|rowspan=2 |
|rowspan=2 |Stephen Harper
|-
|
|Larry R. Heather (CHP)229 0.44%
|-
|rowspan=2 bgcolor=whitesmoke|Calgary West
|rowspan=2 |
|rowspan=2 |Justin Thompson16,40229.27%
|rowspan=2 |
|rowspan=2 |Rob Anders31,32255.90%
|rowspan=2 |
|rowspan=2 |Tim Patterson3,6326.48%
|rowspan=2 |
|rowspan=2 |Danielle Roberts4,2747.63%
|
|James S. Kohut (CAP)315 0.56%
|rowspan=2 |
|rowspan=2 |Rob Anders
|-
|
|André Vachon (M-L)87 0.16%
|}

British Columbia
 British Columbia is what many pundits consider to be the complete opposite of a bellwether region. British Columbia has a history of voting against the government. This has meant the NDP in the 1980s and the Reform/Canadian Alliance in the 1990s. More recently, regional trends have started to appear in B.C. The interior votes very Conservative, as the Canadian Alliance swept this area in 2000. B.C. has in the past been a province that would swing from one extreme to the other going for the right wing Social Credit to the left wing NDP in the past, in not only federal elections but provincial elections. The NDP also does well in British Columbia, or at least has in the past. Recently, they have been reduced to seats in the Vancouver area. There is hope that they will return to more traditional NDP seats on Vancouver Island, and in the interior. The Liberals have also won a few seats in B.C. recently, an area they have traditionally done very poor. Their strengths are in Victoria and in Vancouver.

Interior B.C.

Fraser Valley and Southern Lower Mainland

Vancouver and Northern Lower Mainland

Vancouver Island

Nunavut

Northwest Territories

Yukon

See also
 List of Canadian federal electoral districts

Sources
 Complete List of Official Candidates—Elections Canada
 Election Almanac - Canada Federal Election
 http://www.electionprediction.org/2004_fed/

2004 Canadian federal election
Canadian federal election results